Round Lake is the name of several lakes in the U.S. state of Michigan:

Notes

References 

Round Lake